The Gauschla is a mountain of the Appenzell Alps, located north of Sargans in the canton of St. Gallen, Switzerland. It lies near the southern end of the range between the Walensee and the Rhine Valley, and one kilometre south-east of the Alvier. Just 600 metres south-east of the Gonschla, and clearly seen from the Rhine Valley, is the Girrenspitz.

References

External links
Gauschla on Hikr

Mountains of the Alps
Mountains of the canton of St. Gallen
Appenzell Alps
Mountains of Switzerland